In the geologic timescale, the Anisian is the lower stage or earliest age of the Middle Triassic series or epoch and lasted from  million years ago until  million years ago. The Anisian Age succeeds the Olenekian Age (part of the Lower Triassic Epoch) and precedes the Ladinian Age.

Stratigraphic definitions
The stage and its name were established by Austrian geologists Wilhelm Heinrich Waagen and Carl Diener in 1895. The name comes from Anisus, the Latin name of the river Enns. The original type locality is at Großreifling in the Austrian state of Styria.

The base of the Anisian Stage (also the base of the Middle Triassic series) is sometimes laid at the first appearance of conodont species Chiosella timorensis in the stratigraphic record. Other stratigraphers prefer to use the base of magnetic chronozone MT1n. There is no accepted global reference profile for the base, but one (GSSP or golden spike) was proposed at a flank of the mountain Deşli Caira in the Romanian Dobruja.

The top of the Anisian (the base of the Ladinian) is at the first appearance of ammonite species Eoprotrachyceras curionii and the ammonite family Trachyceratidae. The conodont species Neogondolella praehungarica appears at the same level.

Especially in Central Europe the Anisian Stage is sometimes subdivided into four substages: Aegean, Bythinian, Pelsonian and Illyrian.

The Anisian contains six ammonite biozones:
zone of Nevadites
zone of Hungarites
zone of Paraceratites
zone of Balatonites balatonicus
zone of Kocaelia
zone of Acrochordiceras

Notable formations 

 Ashfield Shale (New South Wales, Australia)
 Cynognathus Assemblage Zone / Burgersdorp Formation (subzone C)* (South Africa)
 Besano Formation (Switzerland and Italy)
 Denwa Formation* (India)
 Donguz Svita* (Russia)
 Upper Ermaying Formation (Shaanxi and Shanxi, China)
 Favret Formation / Prida Formation (Fossil Hill Member) (Nevada, USA)
 Grès à Voltzia (France)
 Guanling Formation (Guizhou and Yunnan, China)
 Manda Beds* (Tanzania)
 Moenkopi Formation (Holbrook and Anton Chico members) (SW USA)
 Lower and Middle Muschelkalk (central Europe)
 Ntawere Formation* (Zambia)
 Omingonde Formation* (Namibia)
 Röt Formation / Upper Buntsandstein (Germany)
 Yerrapalli Formation* (India)

* Tentatively assigned to the Anisian; age estimated primarily via terrestrial tetrapod biostratigraphy (see Triassic land vertebrate faunachrons)

References

Notes

Literature
; 2005: The Global boundary Stratotype Section and Point (GSSP) of the Ladinian Stage (Middle Triassic) at Bagolino (Southern Alps, Northern Italy) and its implications for the Triassic time scale, Episodes 28(4), pp. 233–244.
; 2007: The Global Boundary Stratotype Section and Point (GSSP) for the base of the Anisian Stage: Deşli Caira Hill, North Dobrogea, Romania, Albertiana 36, pp. 54–71.
; 2004: A Geologic Time Scale 2004, Cambridge University Press.

External links
GeoWhen Database - Anisian
Lower Triassic timescale at the website of the subcommission for stratigraphic information of the ICS
Lower Triassic timescale at the website of Norges Network of offshore records of geology and stratigraphy.

 
01
Geological ages
Triassic geochronology